William Rydelere (fl. 1381–1397), of Horsham, Sussex, was an English politician.

Family
Rydelere had two children, a son, the MP, William Rydelere, and a daughter. Her name and that of their mother are unrecorded.

Career
He was a Member (MP) of the Parliament of England for Horsham in 1381, April 1384, November 1384, 1386, February 1388 and January 1397.

References

Year of birth missing
Year of death missing
English MPs 1381
People from Horsham
English MPs April 1384
English MPs November 1384
English MPs 1386
English MPs February 1388
English MPs January 1397